Olle Nordberg may refer to:

Olle Nordberg (golfer) (born 1967), Swedish golfer
Olle Nordberg (painter) (1905–1986), Swedish painter